Erminnie A. Smith, née Erminnie Adelle Platt (April 26, 1836– June 9, 1886) was a linguist, ethnologist, anthropologist and geologist who worked at the Smithsonian Institution's Bureau of American Ethnology.  She has been called the "first woman field enthnographer" and was the first female member elected to the New York Academy of Sciences on November 5, 1877.

Erminnie Smith published multiple works on the language and culture of the Iroquois people. She was active in collecting their legends and employed John Napoleon Brinton Hewitt to assist in this work. Her work on the Iroquois, along with that of Alice Fletcher on the Omaha and other tribes, and Matilda Coxe Stevenson on the Zuni people, challenged views of women's position in both “primitive” and Victorian societies. Her accounts showed that Iroquois women held rights to property and other social freedoms that Victorian women lacked, and that they were honored and respected for their involvement and contributions to culture, economics and ritual practice.

Life
Erminnie Adelle Platt was born April 26, 1836 (sometimes given as 1839), in Marcellus, New York, to Joseph and Ermina Dodge Platt.  She graduated in 1853 from the Troy Female Seminary (later known as the Emma Willard School) in Troy, New York. She married Simeon H. Smith in 1855 of Chicago.

Smith spent four years in Germany while her sons attended school.  During that time she completed a degree in geology at the School  of  Mines, Freiburg, Saxony. Smith accumulated a  private  collection  of  geological specimens, one of the largest for its time  in  the United  States. After her death this passed to her sons.

In 1876 Smith founded the Aesthetic Society of Jersey City, a women's club which grew to over 500 members.  They met to discuss topics in science, literature and art, first at her home at 203 Pacific Avenue and later at the Lafayette Reformed Church of Jersey City.  Smith served  as  president of the women's club from 1879-1886, and often lectured at their  monthly  receptions. She is frequently referred to in Echoes of the Aesthetic Society of Jersey City, a collection of poems and essays from meetings of the society. Following her death, the society established an award in her honor and published a small souvenir collection with some of her poems and essays as well as memorial tributes, In memoriam Mrs. Erminnie A. Smith. In addition to the Aesthetic Society of Jersey City, Smith was a member of the women's club Sorosis.

By 1880, when the Bureau of American Ethnology of the Smithsonian Institution in Washington, DC recruited her, Smith was an expert on the Six Nations Iroquois Confederacy in the United States and Canada, which included the  Cayuga, Mohawk, Oneida, Onondaga, Seneca and Tuscarora people.  As part of her work for the Smithsonian,  she published reports on their language and customs including Myths of the Iroquois (1883). Smith collected and classified  over 15,000  words in Iroquois dialects.  She  was adopted into the Tuscarora  tribe  in  Canada  and named  Ka-tei-tei-sta-kwast  (beautiful  flower).  The  Iroquois-English  dictionary she prepared was  published following  her  death.

Smith was a member of the American Association for the Advancement of Science and served as  secretary  of  its  geology and geography section  in  1885.

Smith was the first woman to be elected to the New York Academy of Sciences, on November 5, 1877. Other memberships included the London Scientific Society and the Numismatic and Antiquarian Society of Philadelphia.

Erminnie Smith died at home in Jersey  City,  N.J.  on June 9, 1886.  Following a service at the Lafayette Reformed Church, she was buried in New York Bay Cemetery.

Works

 Myths of the Iroquois, 1883.

See also
Timeline of women in science

References

1836 births
1886 deaths
American anthropologists
American folklorists
Women folklorists
American women anthropologists
Place of birth missing
19th-century American women scientists
Emma Willard School alumni